Goman Dasht (also Romanized as Gomān Dasht and Gamān Dasht; also known as Gamān, Gumbadasht, and Konbadasht) is a village in Darram Rural District, in the Central District of Tarom County, Zanjan Province, Iran. At the 2006 census, its population was 128, in 36 families.

References 

Populated places in Tarom County